In Greek mythology, Hypermnestra (Ancient Greek: Ὑπερμνήστρα Ὑpermnístra) was an Aetolian princess as the daughter of King Thestius of Pleuron and Eurythemis. She was the sister of Althaea, Leda,  Iphiclus, Evippus, Plexippus and Eurypylus. Hypermnestra married Oicles and bore him a son, Amphiaraus, who later took part in the war of the Seven against Thebes, and also two daughters, Polyboea and Iphianeira.

Calydonian Family Tree

Notes

References 

 Diodorus Siculus, The Library of History translated by Charles Henry Oldfather. Twelve volumes. Loeb Classical Library. Cambridge, Massachusetts: Harvard University Press; London: William Heinemann, Ltd. 1989. Vol. 3. Books 4.59–8. Online version at Bill Thayer's Web Site
 Diodorus Siculus, Bibliotheca Historica. Vol 1-2. Immanel Bekker. Ludwig Dindorf. Friedrich Vogel. in aedibus B. G. Teubneri. Leipzig. 1888–1890. Greek text available at the Perseus Digital Library.
 Hesiod, Catalogue of Women from Homeric Hymns, Epic Cycle, Homerica translated by Evelyn-White, H G. Loeb Classical Library Volume 57. London: William Heinemann, 1914. Online version at theio.com
 Pseudo-Apollodorus, The Library with an English Translation by Sir James George Frazer, F.B.A., F.R.S. in 2 Volumes, Cambridge, MA, Harvard University Press; London, William Heinemann Ltd. 1921. Online version at the Perseus Digital Library. Greek text available from the same website.

Women in Greek mythology
Aetolian characters in Greek mythology